The New Orleans school desegregation crisis was a period of intense public resistance in New Orleans following the 1954 U.S. Supreme Court ruling in Brown v. Board of Education that racial segregation of public schools was unconstitutional. The conflict peaked in 1960, when U.S. Circuit Judge J. Skelly Wright ordered that desegregation in New Orleans begin on November 14 of that year.

On November 14, 1960, two New Orleans elementary schools began desegregation. Leona Tate, Tessie Provost, and Gail Etienne, who became known as the McDonogh Three, joined McDonogh 19 Elementary School, while Ruby Bridges joined William Frantz Elementary School. All four 6-year-old girls were met with death threats, racial slurs, and taunts. Widespread boycotts began immediately, and by the end of the day, few white children remained at either school.

On November 16, a race riot broke out in front of a meeting of the Orleans Parish School Board. Following the riot, United States Marshals began accompanying the four girls to their respective schools, while death threats against the children continued. During the next few days, other white parents began returning their children to school.

It took ten more years for the New Orleans public schools to fully integrate. In September 1962, the Catholic schools of Orleans Parish were also integrated.

Background

New Orleans was no stranger to equal access issues in schooling. In the post-Civil War Era, New Orleans was working toward equal access to education for all citizens. In 1868, Louisiana ratified a new Constitution that added language to include “Black Men” in the understanding of “all men created” equal. The state constitution included Article 135, which required Louisiana to provide free public education to all students. It also outlawed racially-segregated schools. The Compromise of 1877 led to the withdrawal of federal troops in Louisiana and returned Democrats to power, erasing the work done to desegregate schools during the Reconstruction Era.

Under the 1896 Plessy v. Ferguson Supreme Court ruling, public schools for both white and African American students were required to support "separate but equal" school facilities. In New Orleans and the rest of the country, this was not the reality; many black public schools were not held to the same standards as white public schools. Suffering from overcrowded and outdated schools, the black community demanded that the Plessy ruling be upheld and enforced. Within this community was a man named Mr. Wilbert Aubert. Wilbert Aubert along with Mrs. Leontine Luke called for a meeting of the Ninth Ward Civic and Improvement League held November 6, 1951, at the Macarty School for black students. After years of protesting for equal schools and not having their requests met, the Ninth Ward Civic and Improvement League created an initiative to file a lawsuit against the Orleans Parish School Board (OPSB).

Aubert took action against the OPSB with the aid of A. P. Tureaud, the chief legal counsel of the National Association for the Advancement of Colored People (NAACP). In Rosana Aubert v. Orleans Parish School Board, they sought better conditions within the African American schools. After two years of waiting on a decision, U.S. District Judge Herbert William Christenberry allowed the case to proceed. It was at this time that the NAACP wanted to take further action and tackle segregation as a whole. On September 5, 1952, Tureaud filed a new suit, Bush v. Orleans Parish School Board, with 21 sets of students as plaintiffs including Earl Benjamin Bush.

The case called into question whether segregation was constitutional and, if so, called for equal and fair conditions in African American schools. It was the 1954 Kansas case, Brown v. Board of Education of Topeka, however, that called for nationwide desegregation of all public schools. Following the original Brown decision, the Supreme Court in Brown II (1955) called for integration to take place with "all deliberate speed"—a phrase interpreted differently by each side. Supporters of desegregation thought that it meant schools should be desegregated immediately, but opponents of desegregation believed that leniency was allowed in the timeframe for desegregation.

Despite progressive feelings in New Orleans on desegregating the city, feelings toward the school system took a different turn. After Brown, only five African-American students, all of whom were female, transferred. Despite Judge J. Skelly Wright's ruling on February 15, 1956, ordering the OPSB to create an integration plan for all public schools, Senator William M. Rainach and the Louisiana State Legislature ordered all public schools to maintain segregation laws. The legislature also passed a bill allowing them to declare public schools as either white or colored.

Fighting along with the Louisiana State Legislature against integration was the OPSB and board member Emile Wagner. Gerald Rault, assisted by Judge Leander Perez, was the legal counsel in the case against the integration of public schools. Making it all the way to the Supreme Court, Rault and Perez's case was dismissed and Wright's ruling was upheld. The state legislature continued to ignore the integration order, and the NAACP demanded that Judge Wright enforce his ruling. In response to the state legislature's resistance and the NAACP's request, Judge Wright gave on July 15, 1959, a deadline of March 1, 1960, to the OPSB, the date that it would be required to integrate public schools.

Judge Wright took action and created his own plan when the school board failed to meet the March 1 deadline as well as the extended deadline of March 16. The deadline for Judge Wright's desegregation plan was September 1960 when all public schools opened for the year. His plan allowed children to transfer schools and for their parents to choose any of the former white or black schools closest to their homes. White racial separatists raged over Wright's decision, but organizations such as Save Our Schools and the Committee for Public Education called for the integration plan to be pushed forward. The plan would apply only to the first grade, which carried the highest percentage of black students.

Once again, Wright made an agreement with the legislature to delay the plan until November 14. The board was convinced that if it delayed the plan until after the start of the school year, the students would not transfer after they were already comfortable at the school that they were attending. The delay would also allow enough time for the board and the legislature to create a plan that would create a law allowing them to decide where a child could and could not attend school.

When it came time to allow students to apply to transfer schools, the school board made it as difficult as possible. With very specific criteria such as availability of transportation and intelligence testing, it was almost impossible for black students to transfer schools. That proved to be true when only five black girls fit the criteria for transferring. To delay the integration of the schools even further, Superintendent James F. Redmond ordered the principals of the two integrated public schools to close their schools Monday, November 14. That would give Governor Jimmie Davis and the legislature time to propose 30 bills that would make integration illegal even though Wright had already declared most of them unconstitutional. Less than 24 hours later, the U.S. Court of Appeals for the Fifth Circuit ruled all 30 bills unconstitutional. On November 14, the school system had officially been desegregated.

Desegregation
The New Orleans school district integrated William Frantz Elementary School and Mcdonogh Elementary on November 14, 1960. This was met with outrage. The public held the opinion that an uptown school would be used because children in the uptown schools had wealthier parents that could afford to enroll their children in a segregated school. Instead, desegregation happened in significantly more impoverished schools in the Lower Ninth Ward.

Five girls were selected to attend white schools but of the five only four decided to transfer: Leona Tate, Tessie Prevost, and Gaile Etienne attended Mcdonough No. 19 while Ruby Bridges attended William Frantz Elementary. The girls were escorted to and from school by U.S. Marshals. They were met by a large crowd of angry protestors. As word spread that Mcdonough No. 19 and William Frantz were the schools that would be chosen for integration, more people joined the protest. Concerned white parents began picking up their children. A group formed and began chanting "segregation forever". They also cheered for every white student who left school that day.

Soon a group known as "The Cheerleaders" formed. They were a group of mostly middle-class housewives, outraged by the schools' desegregation.  Leander Perez, a popular white supremacist leader held a meeting which 5,000 people attended. The day after Perez's meeting hundreds of teenagers gathered at the school board office and dispersed after the police arrived in riot gear. Reporters flocked to the city to report on the civil unrest. The protesters yelling at the six-year-old girls made the city look undesirable to many people. So much, that many people wrote to the mayor at the time. Mayor Morrison soon asked reporters to leave but did not address the protests. Soon the rioting died down and the school year continued. The residents of New Orleans realized that it made them look bad and changed their behavior. Many white families moved to the St. Bernard Parish and between 1960 and 1970, the white population fell in the Lower Ninth Ward by 77 percent.

In total 194 people were arrested for loitering, 27 for vandalism, and 29 for carrying a concealed weapon. Stabbing and gas bombing incidents happened throughout the city and a large fight between groups of black and white people broke out. Several Louisiana officials flew to Florida to meet with President-elect John F. Kennedy with the intention to seek his opinion on the situation. They claimed that federally prohibiting state interference against the state's will was wrong. Kennedy designated Clark Clifford to meet the group. He said it was inappropriate for Kennedy to talk about such matters; but after the meeting Clifford telephoned Christian Faser, who he had just met with, claiming that Kennedy agreed.

Aftermath
In years following the New Orleans School Crisis of 1960, the city quickly tried to forget one of the most tumultuous parts of its history. The young African American girls who were chosen to be the first to integrate the New Orleans public schools "were largely forgotten" and while memories may fade, there remains a deep division of demographics in contemporary private and public schools in New Orleans. Two decades following the crisis, white enrollment fell by almost half as middle- and upper-class white and black families began to send their children to private institutions.  A relatively steady decrease in white enrollment in private schools and a slight increase in African American enrollment at public schools continued so that by the 2004–2005 school year (the year before Hurricane Katrina), 94 percent of New Orleans public school students were from lower-income, African American families who could not afford to send their children to private schools. Among these schools, two-thirds of them were rated "Academically Unacceptable" according to Louisiana's accountability standards.

Some progress to improve the quality of education in New Orleans has been made since the crisis and Hurricane Katrina: test scores have improved, new charter schools are opening, and facilities are being upgraded. One thing that remains the same, however, is that although the city's population is about 40 percent white, the student bodies at public and charter schools are overwhelmingly African American.   Conversely, New Orleans has one of the highest percentages of children enrolled in private schools within Louisiana and the United States. Some attribute this growth to the "strong relationship between Catholic and independent schools," however, another possible explanation could be the public's apprehension towards public schools in general. Whether or not this is an issue of race, the trends in demographics between public, charter and private schools are clear: public and charter schools, with highly concentrated African American populations, suffer from underfunding of hurricane-damaged facilities, faculties, and staffs, and educational resources whereas private schools, with highly concentrated white populations, benefit from private funding. It is predicted that if achievement levels continue to rise, white students will begin to return to public schools to help create more diverse student bodies at public and charter school systems  but only time will tell. Although there are no legal requirements that schools integrate, there are legal requirements that they improve.

See also
Desegregated public schools in New Orleans

References

Further reading

External links

1960 in Louisiana
1960 protests
Civil rights movement
Education in New Orleans
November 1960 events in the United States
School segregation in the United States